The SVG Working Group is a working group created by the World Wide Web Consortium (W3C) to address the need for an alternative to the PostScript document format. The PostScript format was unable to create scalable fonts and objects without creating files which were inordinately larger than a file which used unscalable fonts and objects.

In April 1998, the W3C received a note from representatives of four corporate entities  – Adobe Systems, IBM, Netscape and Sun Microsystems  –  with regard to the Precision Graphics Markup Language (PGML), an XML-based markup language.

A second note was submitted came a month later from a team which included representatives of Hewlett Packard, Macromedia, Microsoft, and Visio; the note contained a draft specification for the Vector Markup Language (VML), another XML-based markup language.

As a result of both missives, the W3C convened a working group, and within six months, the group published a working draft of requirements for the Scalable Vector Graphics (SVG) format. This format, unlike Postscript, is optimized for the Web. It is able to describe two-dimensional graphics and graphical applications via XML.

Initial versions of the SVG specification have now been natively implemented by most modern browsers. The SVG Working Group continues to work on enhancements, which will be published as a comprehensive SVG 2.0 specification. As of September 2014, the various modules of this new specification were expected to reach Candidate Recommendation status in 2015 or early 2016.

Members
Members of the SVG Working Group include representatives from the following organizations:

 Adobe Systems Inc.
 Apple
 AutoCAD
 BitFlash
 Open Text (BitFlash Division)
 Canon, Inc.
 ERCIM
 Ericsson
 Expway
 France Telecom
 Groupe des Écoles des Télécommunications
 Ikivo AB
 ILOG
 Inkscape
 ITEDO Software GmbH
 KDDI Corporation
 Keio University
 Kodak
 Microsoft
 Mozilla
 Opera Software
 Research In Motion, Ltd. (RIM)
 Sharp Corporation
 Sun Microsystems Inc.

W3C has also invited several experts to collaborate with the working group.

Notes

External links
Official site
SVG Charter
SVG Roadmap
SVG Brings Fast Vector Graphics to Web

Working Group

Working groups
World Wide Web Consortium